Narsipuram is a village located in Parvathipuram Manyam  district, Andhra Pradesh, 3 km from Parvathipuram. Located on the stretch of NH-43, it is accessible by all modes of transportation and has a railway station for most of the trains from Visakhapatnam to Rayagada.

Demographics 

 census, had a population of 6,016. The total population constitute, 2,961 males and 3,055 females —a sex ratio of 1032 females per 1000 males. 560 children are in the age group of 0–6 years, of which 270 are boys and 290 are girls —a ratio of 1074 per 1000. The average literacy rate stands at 70.89% with 3,377 literates, significantly higher than the state average of 67.41%.

References

Villages in Vizianagaram district